Placido Scoppa, C.R.  (10 October 1640 – December 1710) was a Roman Catholic prelate who served as Archbishop (Personal Title) of Venosa (1699–1710) and Archbishop of Dubrovnik (1693–1699).

Biography
Placido Scoppa was born in Messina, Italy on 10 October 1640 and ordained a priest in the Congregation of Clerics Regular of the Divine Providence on 12 October 1664.
On 8 June 1693, he was appointed during the papacy of Pope Innocent XII as Archbishop of Dubrovnik.
On 14 June 1693, he was consecrated bishop by Pier Matteo Petrucci, Cardinal-Priest of San Marcello, with Giuseppe Felice Barlacci, Bishop Emeritus of Narni, and Francesco Maria Moles, Bishop of Nola, serving as co-consecrators. 
On 11 April 1699, he was appointed during the papacy of Pope Innocent XII as Archbishop (Personal Title) of Venosa.
He served as Archbishop (Personal Title) of Venosa until his death in December 1710.

Episcopal succession
While bishop, he was the principal co-consecrator of:
Filippo Anastasio, Archbishop of Sorrento (1699); 
Francesco Girgenti, Bishop of Patti (1699);
Giuseppe Falces, Bishop of Pozzuoli (1699); and
Vincenzo Corcione, Bishop of Capaccio (1699).

References

External links and additional sources
 (for Chronology of Bishops) 
 (for Chronology of Bishops) 
 (for Chronology of Bishops) 
 (for Chronology of Bishops) 

17th-century Roman Catholic archbishops in the Republic of Venice
18th-century Italian Roman Catholic titular archbishops
Bishops appointed by Pope Innocent XII
1640 births
1710 deaths
Theatine bishops
People from Messina